Hamlet Gonashvili (20 June 1928 – 25 July 1985), sometimes referred to as "the voice of Georgia", was a Georgian singer (baritone), influential teacher and performer of traditional Georgian music.

Gonashvili was born in eastern Georgia and is considered the best interpreter of songs from the Kartli and Kakheti regions. He was a recipient of many national honours and prizes. The Third Symphony of the Georgian composer Giya Kancheli drew inspiration from Gonashvili's singing, and he was himself the soloist in the first recording of the work (Olympia Records, 1979). He died in 1985, at the height of his fame, as the result of a fall from an apple tree. Hamlet (JARO, 1985) is a collection of his most impressive songs.

References 

1928 births
1985 deaths
Folk singers from Georgia (country)
20th-century male singers from Georgia (country)
Soviet male singers